Paul Winter-Hart (born 19 September 1971 in Hammersmith, London) is the drummer for the English band Kula Shaker. He grew up in East Pennard, Somerset, and is noted for being reserved in interviews.

In between Kula Shaker splitting in 1999 and reforming in 2006, Winterhart played drums for Thirteen:13, did sessions work with Aqualung and formed blues-rock band "Zero Point Field", who prior to Kula Shaker reforming were working on their debut album. After Kula Shaker released Pilgrim's Progress, Winterhart also played in the Somerset psychedelic rock band, Goldray, with Reef guitarist Kenwyn House, and the London-based alternative rock band Black Casino & The Ghost.

Winterhart lives in Lower Clapton, Hackney, London, with his wife, Nicole, his children, Ivy and Faye, and his Newfoundland dog, Willow. Willow is so large that she was once mistakenly believed to be the "Beast of Hackney Marshes".

References

Living people
1971 births
English rock drummers
British male drummers
People from Hammersmith
21st-century drummers
21st-century British male musicians